Pietro Martire Ponzone (died 1592) was a Roman Catholic prelate who served as Bishop of Novara (1591–1592).

Biography
On 8 February 1591, Pietro Martire Ponzone was appointed during the papacy of Pope Gregory XIV as Bishop of Novara.
He served as Bishop of Novara until his death on 19 November 1592.

References

External links and additional sources
 (for Chronology of Bishops) 
 (for Chronology of Bishops) 

16th-century Italian Roman Catholic bishops
Bishops appointed by Pope Gregory XIV
1592 deaths